William Henry Husk (1814–1887) was an English historian of music and critic.

Life
Husk was born in London on 4 November 1814. From 1833 to 1886 he was clerk to a firm of solicitors. As an amateur musician, taught by his godfather John Bernard Sale, he joined the Sacred Harmonic Society two years after its foundation in 1832; and in 1853 he was appointed honorary librarian. Husk held this post until the dissolution of the Society in 1882; its library went to the Royal College of Music.

Husk died, after a fortnight's illness, on 12 August 1887.

Works
Husk published a Catalogue with a Preface (1862) of the library of the Sacred Harmonic Society; new edition "revised and greatly augmented", 1872. He wrote prefaces to the word-books of the oratorios performed at the Sacred Harmonic concerts. He was also author of Account of the Musical Celebrations on St. Cecilia's Day in the 16th, 17th, and 18th Centuries, to which is appended a Collection of Odes on St. Cecilia's Day, London, 1857. He edited, with notes, Songs of the Nativity; being Christmas Carols, Ancient and Modern, several of which appear for the first time in a Collection, London, 1868; and contributed to Grove's Dictionary of Music and Musicians.

Notes

Attribution

1814 births
1887 deaths
English librarians
English musicologists
English writers
19th-century musicologists